"Once in a Blue Moon" is a song written by Robert Byrne and Tom Brasfield, and recorded by American country music artist Earl Thomas Conley.  It was released in January 1986 as the second and final single from his Greatest Hits compilation album.  The song was Conley's eleventh number one on the country chart.  The single went to number one for one week and spent fourteen weeks on the country chart.

Music video
A music video for the song was released and has been seen on GAC. During the video's prologue, "Silent Treatment" (Conley's first top 10 hit) can be heard in the background.

Chart performance

References
 

1986 singles
1986 songs
Earl Thomas Conley songs
Songs written by Robert Byrne (songwriter)
RCA Records singles
Songs written by Tom Brasfield